Black alder is a common name for several plants and may refer to:
Alnus glutinosa, native to Europe and widely naturalized
Ilex verticillata, native to eastern North America